The Constitutional Court of Azerbaijan Republic is an independent state body of the Republic of Azerbaijan which jurisdiction is prescribed by the Constitution of Azerbaijan. The Constitutional Court gives interpretation of the Constitution and laws based on petitions of the President of Republic, Milli Majlis, Cabinet of Ministers, Supreme Court, Prosecutor's Office and Ali Majlis of Nakhichevan Autonomous Republic.

Overview 
To ensure the supremacy of the Constitution of Azerbaijan and protect the fundamental rights and freedoms of individuals are the main objectives of the Court.

The Constitution of Azerbaijan (adopted on November 12, 1995), interstate agreements (Azerbaijan is a party to), Law “On Constitutional Court” (adopted on December 23, 2003), other laws and the Rules of Procedure of the Constitutional Court are the legal basis for the activity of the Constitutional Court.

The President of Azerbaijan, Milli Majlis, Cabinet of Ministers, Supreme Court of Azerbaijan, Prosecutor's Office of Azerbaijan, Ali Majlis of Nakhichevan Autonomous Republic, Courts, Individuals and Ombudsman may apply to Constitutional Court according to Constitution of Azerbaijan.

The Constitutional Court can examine individual complaints by any person who alleges that his/her rights and freedoms have been violated by the normative legal act of the legislative and executive, the acts adopted by municipality or a court.

Composition 
The Constitutional Court was established on 14 July 1998. It is composed of 9 judges, appointed by the Milli Majlis upon recommendation of the president of the Republic. The judges are appointed for a period of 15 years, without possibility to be re-appointed to the same post.

The president of Azerbaijan appoints the chairman and deputy chairman of Constitutional Court.

The chairman of the Constitutional Court is Mr. Farhad Abdullayev and the deputy chairman is Mrs. Sona Salmanova.

Activity  
The principles of the activity of the Constitutional Court are the following ones:

 Supremacy
 Independence
 Collegiality 
 Evidence.

The State flag, State coat of arms of the Republic of Azerbaijan and the official emblem of Constitutional Court are the symbols of Constitutional Court.

The 20th anniversary of establishment of Constitutional Court of Azerbaijan was celebrated in July 2018.

International relations 
There was a Protocol on Agreement inked on 10 May between Constitutional Court of Azerbaijani Republic and Constitutional Court of Turkey.

See also 
 Politics of Azerbaijan
 Judiciary of Azerbaijan

References

External links 
 Official website

Politics of Azerbaijan
Constitutional courts